The Manhattan Projects is a science fiction comic book series co-created by writer Jonathan Hickman and artist Nick Pitarra published by Image Comics. The premise is an alternate history near the end of World War II in which the Manhattan Project was a front for other more esoteric science fiction ideas. The series is a monthly ongoing and began in March 2012 to much critical acclaim.

The series was relaunched as Manhattan Projects: The Sun Beyond the Stars on March 11, 2015.

Characters
Joseph Oppenheimer, an American physicist with fractured personalities; Robert Oppenheimer's evil, psychopathic twin brother. He can gain knowledge from an individual after eating them, as he did with his brother. In his mindscape, an ongoing civil war occurs between Robert and Joseph's personality as well as their respective armies of personality analogues. Although cooperative at first and spearheading three major projects, he would later betray the team for his personal goals before being killed. 
Albert Einstein, a German physicist. After encountering his alternate-reality self, he was forcibly displaced to the alternate dimension. Using his intelligence to travel through and survive alternate worlds, he finally returns to his original reality as a barbarian. He would later kill Oppenheimer and start an expedition across alternate worlds through his portal.
Albrecht Einstein, the alcoholic alternate reality version, posing as the original Albert Einstein after switching places. He would later join Albert Einstein's expedition. 
Richard Feynman, a somewhat narcissistic American theoretical physicist. He helped activate Einstein's portal and would also join Albert Einstein's expedition. 
Enrico Fermi, an extra-terrestrial disguised as an Italian physicist. Although cooperative at first, it was revealed that he attempted to kill Daghlian and sabotage the Project from the beginning, only to be killed and experimented on by Einstein.
William Westmoreland, a US Army general and a sadist. He is tasked by John F. Kennedy to terminate the Manhattan Projects before conspiring with Groves and Johnson. He would later assassinate Kennedy and frame it on Lee Harvey Oswald. 
Harry Daghlian, an irradiated American physicist; later dubbed the "Atomic Messiah". The "Demon core" incident left him a sentient, extremely radioactive skeleton. 
Wernher von Braun, a German rocket scientist with robotic prosthetic limbs. 
Leslie Groves, a no-nonsense US Army general and director of the Manhattan Projects. He ordered the Hiroshima and Nagasaki atomic bombings and was the reason for Manhattan Projects' continuation. He would later conspire with Westmoreland and Johnson. 
FDR: A.I., the artificial intelligence of the deceased American president, Franklin D. Roosevelt.
Lyndon B. Johnson, the 37th President of the United States of America and conspirator of Kennedy's assassination.
Harry S. Truman, the 33rd President of the United States of America, a Freemason cultist, and leader of the Illuminatorium. 
Yuri Gagarin, a Russian cosmonaut and national hero of the Soviet Union. After escaping the attack on Star City, he and von Braun decides to explore space in hopes of finding Laika.
Laika, a Russian talking space dog and Gagarin's close companion. 
Helmutt Gröttrup, a German rocket scientist and engineer. He was made the Project's slave for his cowardice.
Dmitriy Ustinov, a 'brain-in-a-jar' android and the Soviet Minister of Defence.
John F. Kennedy, the 35th President of the United States of America. He is a drug-addict who ordered the termination of the Manhattan Projects, regarding them as conspiring with the enemy before being assassinated. 
Leonid Brezhnev, the Soviet General Secretary who was mutated by the alien matter retrieved from the Tunguska event. He alongside his team was tasked by the Soviet government to terminate Star City and those involved in it for conspiring with the enemy.
Che Guevara, an Argentine revolutionary, military strategist, and diplomat. He was captured by Brezhnev's team, craniotomized, and eventually mind-controlled by the Soviets.
Fidel Castro, a Cuban revolutionary and politician. He was also captured by Brezhnev's team, craniotomized, and eventually mind-controlled by the Soviets.

Collected editions
The Manhattan Projects has been collected into the following trade paperbacks:

The Manhattan Projects has been collected into the following hardcover collections:

References

External links
 Review from Comics Alliance
 Review from Comic Book Resources
 Manhattan Projects bends history around atomic bomb USA Today

2012 comics debuts
Comics by Jonathan Hickman
Shadowline titles
Alternate history comics
Science fiction comics
Cold War in popular culture
Comics set in the 1940s
Comics set in the 1950s
Comics set in the 1960s
Cultural depictions of Albert Einstein
Cultural depictions of Wernher von Braun
Cultural depictions of Franklin D. Roosevelt
Cultural depictions of Lyndon B. Johnson
Cultural depictions of Harry S. Truman
Cultural depictions of John F. Kennedy
Cultural depictions of Yuri Gagarin
Cultural depictions of Leonid Brezhnev
Cultural depictions of Fidel Castro
Cultural depictions of Che Guevara
Comics set in the United States
Comics set in Germany
Comics set in the Soviet Union
Comics set during World War II
Comics set during the Cold War